Behnisch may refer to:

Günter Behnisch (1922–2010), German architect
Willi Behnisch (born 1956), Argentine cinematographer, film director, and screenplay writer
Behnisch Architekten, an international architectural firm
Surnames from given names